Barbodes wynaadensis is a species of cyprinid fish. It is endemic to the Wyanad Plateau and its surroundings in the southern Western Ghats, India. It occurs in fast-flowing rivers and streams with rock substrates.  This species can reach a length of  TL.  It is of minor importance to local commercial fisheries.

Species revision in 2014 based on phylogenetic study has moved this fish from Barbodes to Neolissochilus.

References

wynaadensis
Cyprinid fish of Asia
Freshwater fish of India
Endemic fauna of the Western Ghats
Fish described in 1873
Taxa named by Francis Day